Amethysa macquarti is a species of ulidiid or picture-winged fly in the genus Amethysa of the family Ulidiidae.

References

Amethysa